Fédération Internationale de l'Art Photographique, or FIAP (Eng. The International Federation of Photographic Art), is an international organization of national associations of photography. As of 2021 91 national associations are members, comprising over one million individual photographers.

FIAP was founded by M. Van de Wijer of Belgium in 1946, who remained its president until 1976. French is the first official language of FIAP, with official texts translated in English and German.

The first members were the photographic associations from Belgium, the Netherlands, Italy, Portugal and Switzerland. In 1947, Denmark, Finland and Hungary joined. The first FIAP congress took place in Bern, Switzerland in 1950, at which time additional national association members included Austria, Brazil, Cuba, Spain, Finland, France, Ireland, Luxembourg, Sweden, and Yugoslavia.

Distinctions 

The FIAP gives several distinctions to its members, based on their achievements in national and international photo contests under patronage of FIAP. 

As of 2021 there were 256 photographers, awarded the honorary title Master of Photography (MFIAP).

Biennials 

FIAP biennials are organized every two years in a different member country. In even years Black and White and Nature Biennials take place, in odd years Colour Biennials, from time to time there are also Youth Biennials. The latest biennials:
26th FIAP Color Biennial, United Kingdom, 2015
33rd FIAP Black and White Biennial, South Korea, 2015
18th FIAP Nature Biennial, Serbia, 2016
27th FIAP Colour Biennial, Norway, 2017
39th FIAP Youth Biennial, Bulgaria, 2018
19th FIAP Nature Biennial, Oman, 2018
34th FIAP Black & White Biennial, South Africa, 2018
28th FIAP Colour Biennial, Spain, 2019
20th FIAP Nature Biennial, Russia, 2020
29th FIAP Colour Biennial, Château de Forezan, Cognin, France, 2021

References

External links 

Photography organizations
Photography exhibitions